Daffy Duck Hunt is a 1949 Warner Bros. Looney Tunes cartoon, directed by Robert McKimson. The cartoon was released on March 26, 1949, and stars Daffy Duck, Porky Pig and the Barnyard Dawg.

Plot
Porky and Barnyard Dawg (from the Foghorn Leghorn cartoons) are hunting ducks. Daffy sneaks up behind them and empties the gunpowder from their shells, then walks off with the phrase "Duck hunters is the cwaziest peoples!" (a reference to Lew Lehr's Fox Movietone News catchphrase, "Monkeys is the cwaziest people."). When Porky takes aim at Daffy, Daffy is able to continue taunting him, even dancing as a can-can dancer with a bullseye on his rear end - to no ill effect. Porky sends his dog to get Daffy, and the dog decides to trick Daffy, crying loudly that Porky will torture him if he doesn't come back with a duck. Daffy agrees to let the dog "capture" him and carry him back to Porky.

Once they get back to Porky's house, Porky throws Daffy in the deep freeze unit and goes upstairs for a nap. Once out of sight, Daffy starts knocking on the freezer door to be let out. After a brief fight between his good and bad conscience, the dog lets Daffy out of the freezer, reasoning that he can let the duck warm himself a little before putting him back. Daffy tries to leave the house---claiming, in a non sequitur, "There's a guy waitin' for me!"---but is blocked by the dog, who tries to shush him, but he rudely refuses. After making a bunch of noise, Daffy jumps into the dog's mouth just as Porky comes to see what all the noise is about. Upon coming down, Porky thinks the dog is trying to steal the duck for himself, and subsequently beats him. Porky then throws Daffy back in the freezer. The dog is tired of Daffy sassing him, but the duck continues to act silly around him (dressed in heavy winter gear, screaming about needing to get medicine through "tons of ice! NO ESCAPE!", then dead-panning, "How's things been with you?"). When Porky appears, wondering what all the noise is about, Daffy once again jumps into the dog's mouth. A furious Porky once again thinks his dog is stealing Daffy, and pounds him once again. Porky then places Daffy back into the freezer.

Finally, the dog has had enough of Daffy's immaturity and grabs an axe to finish him off. After a chase through the house, Porky, finally having enough of the dog's so-called shenanigans, comes in and threatens the dog's life if Daffy isn't in the freezer. Porky opens the freezer, but both are shocked when Daffy, dressed as Santa Claus, jumps out and starts singing "Jingle Bells". Both Porky and the dog start singing along, until Porky sees that the current month is April. Enraged, Porky knocks Daffy down and is ready to use the axe until he sees a stamp on Daffy: "Do not open 'till Xmas." Daffy smiles at the camera and says, "Christmas—by then, I'll figure a way out of this mess!" The camera then irises out around Daffy's eye which then closes.

Warner Brothers.

Western Animation: Porky's Duck Hunt.

Home media
LaserDisc - Daffy Duck's Screen Classics: Duck Victory
VHS - Looney Tunes: The Collectors Edition Volume 4: Daffy Doodles
DVD - Looney Tunes Golden Collection: Volume 1, Disc Four

Notes/Goofs
This marks a rare occasion where Barnyard Dawg does not use his familiar voice and one of four occasions where Barnyard appears in a non-Foghorn Leghorn cartoon.
This is supposed to be a follow-up or a color remake of "Porky's Duck Hunt".
On the calendar hanging on the wall, the month April appears to have 31 days instead of the correct 30 days.

Soundtrack 
Some official songs from the soundtrack include:

 Jingle Bells - James Pierpont
 Ruslan and Luydmila Overture - Mikhail Glinka
 Silent Night, Holy Night - Franz Gruber
 The Latin Quarter - Harry Warren and Al Dubin
 William Tell Overture - Gioachino Rossini
 You, You Darlin' - M.K.

See also 
List of cartoons featuring Daffy Duck

References

External links

1949 animated films
1949 short films
1949 films
Looney Tunes shorts
Warner Bros. Cartoons animated short films
Films directed by Robert McKimson
Films about hunters
Daffy Duck films
Porky Pig films
Films scored by Carl Stalling
1940s Warner Bros. animated short films
1940s English-language films
Barnyard Dawg films